Highland Village/Lewisville Lake station is an A-train commuter rail station in Highland Village, Texas. It is east of Interstate 35E at Garden Ridge Boulevard, and serves commuters from Highland Village and the Lewisville Lake recreational area.

References

External links
My A-train, DCTA
Keep It Moving Dallas - IH35E

A-train (Denton County Transportation Authority) stations
Railway stations in Denton County, Texas
Railway stations in the United States opened in 2011